"Kind Words (And a Real Good Heart)" is a song written and recorded by British singer-songwriter Joan Armatrading, released as a single from her tenth studio album, Sleight of Hand (1986). The single entered the UK Singles Chart for just one week, peaking at No. 81. It also reached No. 37 on the US Billboard Mainstream Rock chart.

Track listing
7" single
"Kind Words (And a Real Good Heart)"
"Figure of Speech"

12" single
"Kind Words (And a Real Good Heart) (Extended Mix)"
"Kind Words (And A Real Good Heart)"
"Figure of Speech"

Charts

References

External links
 

1986 singles
Joan Armatrading songs
Songs written by Joan Armatrading
1986 songs
A&M Records singles